Thomas Coleman Durkin (1853 – 29 April 1902) was an Australian caricaturist and cartoonist who contributed to various Melbourne newspapers in the late 19th-century.

Durkin was a son of Michael Durkin, born at sea off the coast of Africa (Lat. 29° S | Long. 3° W) aboard the SS West Wind, departed New York 6 September 1852; after many delays arrived at Melbourne on 28 April 1853; eight months port-to-port.

He was contributing to The Bulletin by 1889, and in 1893 he succeeded George Rossi Ashton as The Bulletin'''s Melbourne cartoonist.Personal Gossip, Critic (Adelaide), 16 April 1898, page 11.

He was staff artist for Edward Dyson's Bull Ant newspaper, which failed after being successfully sued by Constable Cornelius Crowe, who was involved in the death in custody of one Alfred Gauge, and was criticised for his behavior in an editorial illustrated by a cartoon of a policeman cheerfully bludgeoning the head of a helpless drunk.

He gave gave drawing lessons to Edward Dyson's brothers Ambrose Dyson and Will Dyson.

His caricature of Henry Richard Harwood which appeared in The Weekly Times'' of 1874 is held by the Australian National Portrait Gallery.

He was married to Alice Durkin. A son, also named Thomas Coleman Durkin, died in Malvern, Victoria on 17 June 1956.

References 

1853 births
1902 deaths
Australian cartoonists
Australian caricaturists
People born at sea